Mere Sai - Shraddha Aur Saburi (English: My Sai - Faith And Patience) is an Indian Hindi-language mythological historical drama  television series which premiered on Sony Entertainment Television on 25 September 2017. It stars Tushar Dalvi in the lead role along with Kishori Godbole, Vaibhav Mangle in supporting roles. The show traces the journey of Sai Baba of Shirdi , a fakir who after witnessing the injustices due to religious and caste discrimination, faces several trials and tribulations on his journey to bring peace and love to the society.

Plot
Sai Baba of Shirdi helps many people of Shirdi village and even fulfils one's needs. He had corrected mistakes of many villainous and greedy people (Kulkarni sarkar) who hate him and his teachings. He showed them the path of Dharma and made them devoted only to God.

Cast

Main
Tushar Dalvi as Sai Baba (2019–present)
Abeer Soofi as Sai Baba (2017-2019)
Abhishek Nigam as Young Sai Baba (2017)
Toral Rasputra / Kishori Godbole as Bayaza Bai/Bayaza Maa
Vaibhav Mangle as Kulkarni Sarkar (2017–2020; 2021–present)
Satish Salgare as Kulkarni Sarkar (2020)

Recurring

Himanshu Rai as Keshav Kulkarni
Saurabh Shrikant as Tatya Patil
Vikas Verma as Uddhav
Vikas Kumar as Ali 
Arsh Syed as Bheema
Piyush Singh as Bhanu
Siddhant Karnick as Ganpat Rao
Aaloak Kapoor as Gokuldas
Sushma Prashant as Appa Kote Patil's mother
Rakshit Wahi as Tatya Patil
Yash Rajendra Karia as Bheema
Anant Mahadevan as Bal Gangadhar Tilak
Manav Soneji as Ali
Vansh Sayani as Baal Sai
Sonal Vengurlekar as Savitri
Ruhanika Dhawan as Rama
Raj Sharnagat as Narayan / Naveen
Sneha Bhawsar as Sulakshana
Shishir Sharma as Sateshwar
Syed Aman Mian Sharma as Keshav Kulkarni
Priyanka Joshi Hait as Rukmini Vaini: Kulkarni's wife
Sharmila Rajaram Shinde as Chihu Tai (Kulkarni's younger sister)
Bhupindder Bhoopii as Santa (2019)
Arun Singh as Devidas
Chirag Dave as Mhalsapati Ji
Vivaek Srivastav as Nanasaheb Chandorkar
Dhruti Mangeshkar as Jhipri 'Lakshmi' (Young)
Drisha Kalyani as Jhipri 'Lakshmi' (Grown)
Hemant Thatte as Appa Kote Patil
Avtaar N Vaishnani as Keshav: Kulkarni's son - young
Bhushan Dhupkar as Panta: Kulkarni's servant
Harpreet Singh Bindra as Anta: Kulkarni's servant
Chandan Madan as Srikanth
Bippin Procha as Ranoji
Mahesh Welkar as
Tarun Khanna as Ratnakar Rao
Siddarth Arya as Bal Sai 
Aishani Yadav as Yamuna: Mhalsapati's eldest daughter
Mohammad Samar as Balram: Pari's cousin
Amit Jaat as Tryambak: Bayaza Maa's younger brother
Anupriya Parmar as Gunwanta Bai: Tryambak's wife
Rajiv Mishra as Dilawar Ali
Sangita Adhikari as Pandhari's wife
Smita Dongre as Funtru Kaki
Flora Saini as Suvarna Bai
Supriya Pilgaonkar as Suhasini Bai: Appa Kote Patil's aunt
Sneha Wagh as Tulsa
Bhawana Meghwal as Nirali's mother
Advait Soman as Uddhav
Tasheen Shah as Tara: Pari's cousin and as Gayatri: Sopan's daughter
Ketki Dave as Kamla Tai: Champa's mother-in-law
Sarita Joshi as Savita
Supriya Pathak as Geeta Maa (cameo)
Sandeep Bhojak As BrahmaNandam (2019)
Nishkarsh Kulshrestha as Raghunath
 Niel Satpuda as Ali (2019) 
Jay Zaveri as Ganpat/Das Ganu Maharaj
Shruti Bhist as Sumati 
Kalpesh Rajgor as Chintamani
Aaditya Bajpayee as Mohan
Anubhav Dixit as Digambar
Anang Desai as Ganjanan
Khushboo Tawde as Tejaswi
Praneet Bhat as Madhusudan
Pankaj Berry as Chakra Narayan
Govind Khatri as Kakasaheb Dixit
Amit Anand Raut as self in episodes 1012-1012 and promo of "Sai Vachan"
Girish Oak as Khashaba
Vikas Singh Rajput as Mahesh
Prachi Vaishnav as Malti
Vishwanath Kulkarni as Hemant
Ahmad Harhash as Raj Verma

Production 
The filming of the series which resumed after three months owing COVID-19 outbreak in India in late June was halt soon in early July until 7 July 2020 when a crew member was tested positive for the virus and the cast and crew were kept under quarantine.

References

External links
 
 
 Mere Sai - Shraddha Aur Saburi on Sony TV

Sony Entertainment Television original programming
2017 Indian television series debuts
2000s Indian television series
Hindi-language television shows
Sai Baba of Shirdi